The Tod Reservoir is located on the Eyre Peninsula in South Australia, in the localities of Whites Flat and Koppio, 27 km north of Port Lincoln. It is situated on the Tod River, the only stream on Eyre Peninsula, South Australia providing reliable flows; the reservoir is supplied by concrete channels fed from weirs constructed across the Tod River and its major tributary, Pillaworta Creek. The river was named after Robert Tod, who discovered it during explorations in 1839. The Tod River flows into Louth Bay in Spencer Gulf. The reservoir is listed on the South Australian Heritage Register.

Tod River Reservoir Museum & Picnic Area 
A museum which features audio and visual displays is located off White Flat Road, northwest of Poonindie. Grounds include a playground, tennis court, coin-operated barbecues and a picnic area. Grounds are open 7 days.  The museum is open Monday to Friday, from 9am to 4pm.

Construction 

Mr C. A. Bayer presented the merits of a dam on the Tod River to the Royal Commission in 1916. An earth embankment dam was built on the Tod River between 1918 and 1922 at a cost of $562,000. In 1921, 600 men were employed on the project. The reservoir overflowed for the first time in August 1932. The water level reached its lowest point in its history in 1949. Low water problems persisted in 1950. In 1951, new pumps were installed at the reservoir.

Fatalities 
Seven people died during the dam's construction. In late 1918, three men were killed in a cave-in. Another four died in two separate blasting accidents in 1921. A memorial to all seven men was erected at the picnic area near the embankment in 1982.

Status 
The catchment yield for the Tod River is estimated to be 11 gigalitres per annum, though this can reduce significantly during periods of drought.

While for some years up to 3,000 ML/year of water was extracted from the reservoir for potable use, negligible water has been extracted since 2001-2002. Reasons for the change include increasing salinity and concerns about the levels of agricultural chemicals in the reservoir. The reservoir has been retained as a ‘contingency' water supply measure since that time.

In April 2011, the Department for Water listed three possible options for the future use of the Tod Reservoir. They were:
 Catchment rehabilitation to improve the health of the Tod Reservoir and the quality of its inflows
 Potential recreational use
 Decommissioning and removing the dam wall
There is widespread support in the Eyre Peninsula community for recommissioning the Tod Reservoir using desalination.

SA Water investigated this option and concluded it was not viable because of the difficulty in finding an environmentally suitable location for brine waste disposal. SA Water also concluded there was insufficient volume of water available in the reservoir to justify desalination. Alternative views exist, with others suggesting that desalination could be viable with some further engineering and catchment management considerations.

In 2013, the reservoir's future has been the topic of Parliamentary debate, including speculation over its future use by iron ore mining company, Centrex Metals.

In September 2014, the Port Lincoln Times reported that the Tod River Reservoir would be opened to recreational fishing and would be stocked with "recreationally attractive species." The change was expected to occur within the 2014-2015 financial year.

Statistics 
Capacity: 11,300 megalitres

Length of wall: 351m

Height of wall: 25m

Type of wall: Earth with clay core

Area of water spread: 134 hectares

See also
List of reservoirs and dams in Australia
List of parks and gardens in rural South Australia

References 

Water supply and sanitation in Australia
Eyre Peninsula
Embankment dams
Dams completed in 1922
Dams in South Australia
Reservoirs in South Australia
South Australian Heritage Register